Walter Charles Dymant (1888–1969) was a pioneer Australian rugby league player who played in the 1910s.

Dymant played five seasons with South Sydney in 1911 and then between 1914 and 1917, which included the 1916 Final which Souths lost to Balmain. Dymant was a member of the South Sydney squad that won the 1914 Premiership.

Dymant died on 28 April 1969, at his Davistown, New South Wales home, aged 80.

References

South Sydney Rabbitohs players
Australian rugby league players
1888 births
1969 deaths
Rugby league fullbacks
Rugby league wingers
Rugby league centres
Place of birth missing